You and Me Equals Us is the second studio album by American musician, Colonel Abrams, released in 1987 through MCA Records.

Commercial performance
The album peaked at No. 25 on the R&B albums chart. The album features the singles "How Soon We Forget", which peaked at No. 6 on the Hot Soul Singles chart and No. 1 on the Hot Dance/Disco chart, and "Nameless", which reached No. 54 on the Hot Soul Singles chart.

Track listing

Personnel
Ron Kersey - keyboards
Norman Harris - guitar on "Caught in the Middle"
Boyd Jarvis - bass synthesizer on "Running"

Charts
Album

Singles

References

External links

1987 albums
Colonel Abrams albums
MCA Records albums